Venevisión is a Venezuelan free-to-air television channel and one of Venezuela's largest television networks, owned by the Cisneros Media division of Grupo Cisneros.

History

The company's roots date back to June 1, 1953, with the establishment of Televisora Mirandina Independiente S.A, (TeleVisa), which operated the channel 4 in Caracas and channel 5 in Maracaibo. When TeleVisa went bankrupt in 1960, Diego Cisneros purchased the remaining assets of the company. On February 27, 1961, Venevisión (a portmanteau based on Velvet de Venezuela - Televisión) was officially inaugurated with a special inaugural on March 1, 1961, show in which thousands of people attended, and took place in the station's parking lot. Venevisión began with a capital of 5,500,000 bolívares and 150 employees including artists, administrators, and technical personnel. Venevisión's original administrators were Diego Cisneros (president), Alfredo Torres (transmission manager), Héctor Beltrán (production manager), and Orlando Cuevas (general manager).

Initially, Venevisión broadcast live because they hadn't yet installed the videotape system. Except for the news, the elaboration of their programs utilized the technical formats used in movies at that time. In a short period of time, Venevisión greatly expanded nationally, and was seen in most of Venezuela on many VHF and UHF channels.

In March 1961, the newly created Venevisión and the American television network, ABC, signed two agreements: one for technical support and the other for the rights to broadcast each other's programs. Because of these agreements, Venevisión later began using the videotape system. In their first year of existence, Venevisión made approximately 800,000 bolívares a month in advertisements. By 1971, it began to bring its then black and white programs to viewers internationally via videotape, with the drama program Esmeralda as the first to do so. In the next year, the network officially took over the broadcasts of the Miss Venezuela beauty pageant, and it has been its home ever since.

In 1976, Venevisión moved their transmitters, which were located on the top of a building in La Colina, a neighborhood in Caracas where Venevisión's studios can be found, to Los Mecedores, near Venezolana de Televisión's studios and CANTV's installations. In Los Mecedores, a tower with an altitude of 100 meters was placed and a powerful new antenna was installed. With this new antenna, Venevisión's signal was able to reach Petare, Caricuao, and Guarenas with better quality. In the 1970s, like other television stations in Venezuela, Venevisión began experimenting with color broadcasts. In 1978, the Ministry of Transport and Communications fined Venevisión 4,000 bolívares on two occasions in one week for violating the regulations for color broadcasting. It was only the next year when color broadcasts commenced, with full color transmissions commencing on June 1, 1980.

The very first programme by Venevision shown in color was the eight edition of the OTI Festival, which was held in Caracas and broadcast live to all Latin-America, Spain and Portugal.

In 1982, Venevisión began preliminary work in the city of El Tigre (located in the Anzoátegui State) to install equipment that would expand and improve their coverage in that region.

On November 1, 1986, Venevisión was the first television station in Venezuela to have their very own satellite dish.

On May 27, 1987, president Jaime Lusinchi gave a 20-year broadcasting licence to the network.

On February 4, 1992, Carlos Andrés Pérez addressed the nation from Venevisión's studios during a coup attempt against his government.

Beginning on March 22, 1992, Venevisión would broadcast for 24 hours on Fridays, Saturdays, and Sundays. In April 1994, it started broadcasting for 24 hours seven days a week. Today, Venevisión is on the air 24 hours a day, seven days a week.

In 1995, Venevisión was the first television station in South America to include news and movies with closed caption and the movies in Second audio program sound.

Venevisión held the broadcasting rights to Venezuelan baseball games during the 2004–2005 and the 2005–2006 baseball seasons.

Since Venevisión was inaugurated in 1961, their mascot has been a tiger.

In 2007, it started simulcasting Copa America and Miss Venezuela 2007 in high-definition format.

Since September 2014, Venevisión currently became the oldest television network in Venezuela and surpassed the record of its former rival Radio Caracas Televisión before its forced closure in May 2007, 53 years and 6 months after it was launched.

Programs

International broadcasts
Many of Venevisión's programs can be seen in other countries on Ve Plus TV, Venevision Plus, Venevision International a cable channel completely owned by Venevisión. Other channels, such as Univision in the United States and Televisa in Mexico, broadcast some of Venevisión's shows.

Political position
Venevisión was a vocal opponent of President Hugo Chávez's government up until 2005, when its criticism was notably toned down. On April 11, 2002, the network along with most of the other private networks in Venezuela, simultaneously showed Chávez's address to the nation in split screen with the shooting of people in a demonstration prior to the 2002 Venezuelan coup d'état attempt. The next day, Isaías Rodríguez announced in a news conference that Chávez had not resigned and that there had been a coup.

However, Venevisión has been criticized by the Venezuelan opposition and Anti-Chávez groups. Since the Presidential election in 2006, it has quieted its opposition to Chávez, similar to rival Televen after the 2004 recall referendum. For the presidential election, Venevision devoted 84% of its coverage to Chavez's positions, and only 16% to the opposition. Many in the opposition and the other anti-Chávez TV networks, Radio Caracas Televisión and Globovisión, saw it as a betrayal and accused both Venevisión and Televen to submitting to Chávez because they eventually renewed their broadcasting concessions. The criticism of Venevisión by the opposition increased during the refusal to renew the broadcasting license of RCTV by the Chávez government in 2007. RCTV was the most watched channel in Venezuela while Venevisión was second. The network renewed its broadcasting concession by the government many times as of 2018. Most viewed Venevisión and its rival Televen of secretly supporting the closure of RCTV since it would benefit itself. Cisneros however, said he expected only around a 5% increase in advertising revenue, after accounting for inflation.

Programming

References

External links
Official website 

 
Mass media companies established in 1961
Spanish-language television stations
Television channels and stations established in 1961
Television stations in Venezuela
Television networks in Venezuela
1961 establishments in Venezuela
Venezuelan brands